Fetr (also Romanized as Feţr and Feţer; also known as Patar and Pathar) is a village in Ilat-e Qaqazan-e Sharqi Rural District, Kuhin District, Qazvin County, Qazvin Province, Iran. At the 2006 census, its population was 97, in 24 families.

References 

Populated places in Qazvin County